Yakutino is a rural locality (a village) in Denisovskoye Rural Settlement, Gorokhovetsky District, Vladimir Oblast, Russia. The population was 17 as of 2010.

Geography 
Yakutino is located 18 km southwest of Gorokhovets (the district's administrative centre) by road. Shubino is the nearest rural locality.

References 

Rural localities in Gorokhovetsky District